Craig Reid may refer to:

Craig Reid (footballer, born 1985), English footballer
Craig Reid (footballer, born 1986), Scottish footballer
 Craig Reid (musician) (born 1962), member of Scottish band The Proclaimers